Finn Strømsted (9 June 1925 – 4 July 2003) was a Norwegian poet and visual artist. He made his literary debut in 1956 with the poetry collection Angelicafløyten. Among his other collections are Bidevind from 1961, Susquehanna Blues from 1971, and En fugl har tent meg from 1995.

He was awarded Mads Wiel Nygaards Endowment in 1973.

References

1925 births
2003 deaths
Writers from Harrisburg, Pennsylvania
20th-century Norwegian poets
Norwegian male poets
Norwegian artists
Artists from Harrisburg, Pennsylvania
20th-century Norwegian male writers